The Clarice Smith Performing Arts Center is a performing arts complex on the campus of the University of Maryland, College Park. The  facility, which opened in 2001, houses six performance venues; the UM School of Music; and the UMD School of Theatre, Dance, and Performance Studies. It also houses the Michelle Smith Performing Arts Library. The center operates under the auspices of the University of Maryland College of Arts and Humanities.

The Center presents an annual performance season of music, dance and theatre featuring visiting artists and student/faculty artists from the performing arts academic programs. In 2014, the venue rebranded itself The Clarice. The introduction of this brand was accompanied by a series of mostly-free-of-charge events called the NextNOW Festival near the beginning of the Fall semester. The center also rents performance and meeting space to community groups.

The building is located on the northern side of the University of Maryland campus, off University Boulevard (MD-193) and Stadium Drive in Prince George's County, Maryland. It is directly across the street from Capital One Field at Maryland Stadium and the 800-space Stadium Drive parking garage.

History
The Clarice Smith Center is named in honor of visual artist Clarice Smith, whose late husband Robert H. Smith (UM ’50) was a major philanthropist who supported projects in culture, business and Jewish life.  As an alumnus of the University of Maryland, he made major contributions to The Clarice Smith Performing Arts Center and to the Robert H. Smith School of Business.

The Clarice Smith Performing Arts Center was originally conceived as an academic center for teaching the performing arts, but during the planning stages that mission evolved to include not only presentation of performances by touring artists, but also the creation of programs that focused on the people of Prince George's County, Maryland, where the University of Maryland is located. Thus there are now occasionally events organized entirely by outside contractors, for which the Center disclaims responsibility.

Architecture
The initial cost of the building was $130 million, supported in partnership by the State of Maryland, the University of Maryland, and Prince George's County. 
It was designed by international architects Moore Ruble Yudell in association with Ayers/Saint/Gross; acoustical consultant Kirkegaard Associates; theatre consultants Theatre Project Consultants; mechanical/electrical/plumbing engineering by Henry Adams LLC; and lobby interiors by Gensler. Construction was by Turner Construction Company.

Five of the center's six performance spaces are accessible from the Grand Pavilion, the center's main lobby; the sixth is at the top of the stairs in the Upper Pavilion.
 Grand Pavilion
 Dekelboum Concert Hall
  962-seat concert hall
 Ina and Jack Kay Theatre
 626-seat proscenium theatre 
 Used for performances with large casts and elaborate sets
 Joseph and Alma Gildenhorn Recital Hall
 297-seat jewel-box theatre 
 Bring acoustics to highlight musical performances
 Dance Theatre
 207-seat theatre
 sprung wooden floors and retractable seats
 It holds performances, rehearsals, lectures and workshops
 Robert and Arlene Kogod Theatre
 This 156-seat theatre is a multipurpose black box theatre
 It holds performances along with meetings and receptions
 Cafritz Foundation Theatre
 An 86-seat black box theatre
 It holds performances, lectures, meetings, and special events
 Leah H. Smith Lecture Hall, which often hosts student recitals, and occasionally other free events such as Creative Dialogues and Talk-Backs with performers.  Also used as a classroom for various different courses.

References

External links

 
 Records of Student Entertainment Events (SEE) records at the University of Maryland Libraries

University of Maryland, College Park facilities
Music venues in Maryland
University and college academic buildings in the United States
University and college arts centers in the United States
Tourist attractions in Prince George's County, Maryland
Music venues completed in 2001
2001 establishments in Maryland